Ainsley Thorpe (born 13 February 1998) is a New Zealand professional triathlete.

Thorpe began participating in triathlons as a 16-year-old. She has competed in the World Triathlon Series since 2018, with a best result of third in the 2019 sprint event in Antwerp. She also competes in the World Triathlon mixed relay series, winning the relay at the Edmonton leg of the series in 2019. She represented her country at the 2020 Summer Olympics, but did not finish the women's triathlon after crashing on the cycle leg. She also competed in the mixed relay alongside Tayler Reid, Hayden Wilde, and Nicole van der Kaay.

Thorpe was listed to compete in the women's trialthlon at the 2022 Commonwealth Games in Birmingham, England, but did not start the event due to COVID-19.

References

External links
 
 
 
 
 

1998 births
Living people
New Zealand female triathletes
Olympic triathletes of New Zealand
Triathletes at the 2020 Summer Olympics
Triathletes at the 2022 Commonwealth Games
Sportspeople from Auckland
20th-century New Zealand women
21st-century New Zealand women